Psychoderelict is a concept album written, produced and engineered by Pete Townshend. Some characters and issues presented in this work were continued in Townshend's later opus The Boy Who Heard Music, first presented on The Who's album Endless Wire and then adapted as a rock musical.

Psychoderelict is Townshend's sixth and most recent solo album to date.

History
Released in 1993, Psychoderelict is a rock opera conceived by Townshend in 1991 as the follow-up to The Iron Man, but despite having recorded several demos, a bicycle accident in September 1991 forced him to delay work on the album until his wrist was able to heal properly. It is structured more like a radio play than the more "traditional" rock operas Townshend had recorded both with The Who (Tommy, Quadrophenia and the unreleased Lifehouse album) and as a solo artist (White City and The Iron Man).

The album's central character is Ray High (real name Raymond Highsmith), a '60s rock star who has dwindled and turned into an alcoholic recluse. Ray's manager, Rastus Knight, worried at the rocker's dwindling bank account, attempts unsuccessfully to talk him into recording new material. Rastus complains about it to radio pop-music reporter Ruth Streeting, an outspoken critic of Ray's. Ruth says she has an idea to "fire him up" and Rastus offers her a cut of the profits if she can do it.

Ruth sends Ray a letter posing as a 15-year-old girl named Rosalind Nathan, who dreams of being a star. She includes in her letter an erotic Polaroid of herself lying naked on her mother's grave when she was 12. Ray responds to her immediately, calling the photograph "stunning" and telling her that they both "share complicated problems."   He offers to help her if she will keep it a secret. He and "Rosalind" exchange several letters, where Ray opens his heart about his insecurity, his life's past tragedies, and his insights into the relationships between the performers, the public, and the press. He sends her a tape of "Flame," a song he wrote for his secret "Gridlife" project. In his last letter he talks about Ruth Streeting, calling her "symbolic of the entire establishment" and saying "her disgust is the greatest motivator of the artist in me." He confesses that he has fallen in love with her. Ruth, now sleeping with Rastus, laughs about it while being spanked.

Ruth publishes the photograph in her "porno pen-pal story," calling Ray a slime ball who took advantage of a young fan's innocence to solicit the photograph and "test out his weird theories." The resulting controversy drives the re-release of Ray's records to huge sales. Rastus is delighted. "Rosalind's" version of "Flame," off of her new Ruth Streeting-produced album, becomes a huge hit. Ruth promotes Rosalind as a "brilliant songwriter" while keeping the real writer of the song a secret, even from Rastus.

Ruth receives her cut of the profits, and Rastus is in seventh heaven, once again rolling in money. Ray, upset about Ruth's exposé, confronts them both. Ruth accuses Ray of "manipulating" Rosalind. Rastus says it all worked out for the best, they're back in calculator country. Ray insists that he was helping Rosalind deal with a problem. Ruth insists Rosalind never had a problem and all Ray did was "help her become a fucking star."

In a meeting with Ruth at a bar, Raymond springs the surprise that he has known all along that Ruth and Rosalind are one and the same. It is heavily implied that Ruth fakes being attracted to Ray so that she can manoeuvre him into writing new material. Ruth, littering her language with endearments, is now producing the "Gridlife" album, which contains a sample of the Who's famous "Baba O'Riley."

At the end of the play, Ray says that "Gridlife" was a vision, not a fiction, and that the apocalypse it foresaw is near. He wonders what happened to peace, love, and "all that hippie shit."

Commentary
The album is a critical, perhaps satirical look at Townshend's own life: the dedication of his music to Meher Baba's teachings, and his Lifehouse project, which closely resembles the Gridlife project on which the Ray High character is working. The album also makes use of Townshend's earlier song "Who Are You" which is sampled on the track "Meher Baba M4 (Signal Box)".

Only one single proper was released from the album: "English Boy", both non-dialogue and dialogue versions, was released with a variety of B-sides and non-album songs, including "Psycho Montage" (a collection of dialogue from the album) and "Electronic Wizardry" (written and recorded in 1970 as a potential track for The Who's unreleased Lifehouse album), as well as demos for "Flame" and "Early Morning Dreams". "Don't Try to Make Me Real", "Outlive the Dinosaur" and "Now and Then" were all issued to radio stations with dialogue excised. A previously unreleased track, "Uneasy Street", was later released on the 1996 Pete Townshend compilation The Best of Pete Townshend: Coolwalkingsmoothtalkingstraightsmokingfirestoking.

After slow sales of the initial dialogue intense release, a "music only" version was issued, though sales and reviews were still disappointing. Fan reception was divided: some felt that Townshend's ideas were too pretentious even for him, while others have embraced it as the first worthy concept since Quadrophenia. To date, it remains the final Pete Townshend solo album of all-original material, although further compilations have surfaced.

The Ray High character would resurface in 2005 as the central character in The Boy Who Heard Music, a novella written by Townshend for his Web site; and again the following year in Townshend's mini rock opera adaptation of that story, Wire & Glass. That mini-opera would become the centrepiece of The Who's comeback album Endless Wire.

Meher Baba instrumentals
There are four instrumental tracks which originated from Townshend's 1970–1971 synthesizer demos for The Who's album Who's Next. Some of these experiments were released as "Baba O'Riley" that year and as "Who Are You" in 1978. On Psychoderelict, the Meher Baba instrumentals appear in this order:
"Meher Baba M3": features a hypnotic synthesizer backing that may have been created specifically for this album. During this song, Ray High can be heard on a tape machine, listening through songs he had demoed as early as 1970 (an obvious allusion to Townshend trawling through his archives for Psychoderelict).
"Meher Baba M4 (Signal Box)": a heavier track that sounds similar to "Who Are You", though this song undoubtedly features overdubs recorded by the musicians Townshend employed for Psychoderelict.
"Meher Baba M5 (Vivaldi)": an upbeat arrangement which draws its inspiration from classical composer Vivaldi.
"Baba O'Riley (demo)": a demo recording of the classic Who track, this time with the "Irish jig" finale that would later feature a violin solo.

Track listing
All tracks written by Pete Townshend, unless otherwise stated.

Bonus tracks from the 2006 Hip-O Records reissue

Personnel
Credited as Psychoderelict family:

 Jeremy Allom
 Jon Astley
 Richard Barnes
 Paul Bonnick
 Ian Broudie
 Mark Brzezicki
 John "Rabbit" Bundrick
 Chyna
 Allan Corduner
 Bruce Davies
 Barry Diament Audio
 Julie Duff of Anne Henderson Casting
 Andrew Eccles
 Nick Goderson
 Linal Haft
 Deirdre Harrison
 Nicky Brown
 Steve Hill
 Peter Hope-Evans
 Icon Communications
 Nicola Joss
 Kick Horns
 Roger Knapp
 John Labanowski
 Jamie Lane
 Dee Lewis
 Gavin Lewis
 Jody Linscott
 Jaz Lochrie
 Andy Macpherson
 Billy Nicholls
 Michael Nicholls
 Tessa Niles
 Phil Palmer
 Josh Phillips-Gorse
 Bob Pridden
 Jan Ravens
 Simon Rogers
 Adam Seymour
 Paul Stevens
 Paul Townshend
 Simon Townshend
 Nigel Walker
 Cleveland Watkiss
 Suzy Webb
 Lee Whitlock
 Paul "Tubbs" Williams
 Ian Wilson

Live in New York featuring Psychoderelict
A performance from Townshend's first North American solo tour was broadcast live from the theatre of the Brooklyn Academy of Music in New York in August 1993. The concert was in three parts: an opening session of eight songs, a complete performance of Psychoderelict and an encore of a further five songs.

The performance was featured by PBS Great Performances and directed by Richard Barnes and Bruce Gowers. It was later issued as a double CD called Pete Townshend Live BAM 1993  and an NTSC all region DVD in 2006, titled Pete Townshend Live in New York Featuring Psychoderelict ASIN: B000B8TJ6W. The DVD included an interview with Pete Townshend conducted by Barry Barnes recorded specifically for this release in September 2005.

Cast
The cast included:
Pete Townshend ... Himself
John Labanowski ... Ray High
Linal Haft ... Rastus Knight
Jan Ravens	... Ruth Streeting
Sage Carter ... Athena
John Bundrick ... Keyboards
Peter Hope Evans ... Harmonica
Andy Fairweather Low ... Guitar, Vocalist
Deirdre Harrison ... Athena (voice)
Katie Kissoon ... Vocalist
Billy Nicholls ... Vocalist
Pino Palladino ... Bass
Phil Palmer ... Guitar
Simon Phillips ... Drums
Lee Whitlock ... Spinner (voice)

Other media
In 1999 Psychoderelict was considered for production as a Broadway musical. Townshend worked on a script with director Ethan Silverman and the show was workshopped with actor Peter Gallagher. However, to date the show has not been produced.

In March 2009, the webcomic 3rd Blade began a serialized adaptation of Psychoderelict.

References

1993 albums
Concept albums
Pete Townshend albums
Rock operas
Rock musicals
Atlantic Records albums
Albums produced by Pete Townshend